Vres Enan Tropo (Greek: Βρες έναν τρόπο) is the title of the fourth studio album by the popular Greek artist Peggy Zina, released in 2002 by Nitro Music. The album went gold several months after release.

Track listing

Singles
"Love Is a Wonderful Thing" was the first single released from the album and was Zina's entry in the Greek national final to choose the song and artist to represent Greece in the Eurovision Song Contest 2002. The song was released first as a radio single and then as a three track CD single in March 2002 and went gold.

References

2002 albums
Greek-language albums
Peggy Zina albums